Oppomorus is a genus of sea snails, marine gastropod mollusks in the family Muricidae, the murex snails or rock snails.

Species
Species within the genus Oppomorus include:
 Oppomorus funiculatus (Reeve, 1846)
 Oppomorus noduliferus (Menke, 1829)
 Oppomorus purpureocinctus (Preston, 1909)

Distribution
This marine genus is endemic to Australia and occurs off New South Wales, Queensland, Western Australia.

References

External links
  Claremont, M.; Houart, R.; Williams, S. T.; Reid, D. G. (2012). A molecular phylogenetic framework for the Ergalataxinae (Neogastropoda: Muricidae). Journal of Molluscan Studies. 79(1): 19-29
 Iredale, T. (1937). Mollusca. In: Whitley, G. P. (ed). Middleton and Elizabeth Reefs, South Pacific Ocean. Australian Zoologist. 8(4): 232-261, pls 15-17 

 
Gastropods of Australia